Mazaeras soteria is a moth of the family Erebidae. It was described by Herbert Druce in 1900. It is found in Argentina.

References

 

Phaegopterina
Moths described in 1900